Johan Wallens Otálvaro (born 3 August 1992) is a Colombian footballer. Currently he plays for Asociacion Deportivo Cali.

National team
Wallens was part of the Colombia national under-17 football team in the 2009 FIFA U-17 World Cup.

South American Championships

FIFA U-17 World Cup

Clubs 
In the year 2012 he briefly moved to the Mexican club Pachuca and in the year 2013 returned to Deportivo Cali.

List of winners

National championships

References 

Footballers from Cali
1992 births
Living people
Colombian footballers
Categoría Primera A players
Cortuluá footballers
C.F. Pachuca players
Deportivo Cali footballers
Colombia youth international footballers
Colombia under-20 international footballers
Colombian expatriate footballers
Expatriate footballers in Mexico
Association football goalkeepers